The following are international rankings of Bangladesh.

Geography

 Total area: ranked 94th
 Land area: ranked 94th
Water area: ranked 39th
Border length: ranked 42nd
Coastline: ranked 88th

Demographics

 Population: ranked 8th
 Population density: ranked 11th
Labor force: ranked 8th
 Number of international migrants: ranked 37th
Number of Muslim population: ranked 4th
Number of Hinduism population: ranked 3rd

Environment

 Environmental Performance Index: ranked 162nd
World Risk Index: ranked 13th

Agriculture and production

 Irrigated land by country, 2012: ranked 10th
Barley production 2020: ranked 57th
Rice production 2020: ranked 3rd
Wheat production 2020: ranked 30th
Onion production: ranked 9th
Cabbage production: ranked 25th
Cauliflower and broccoli production: ranked 9th
Potato production: ranked 7th
Soybean production: ranked 35th
Cucumber production: ranked 48th
Pumpkin production: ranked 16th
Sugarcane production: ranked 33rd
Tomato production: ranked 47th
Garlic production: ranked 3rd

Fruits production

Banana production: ranked 23rd
Mango production: ranked 9th
Papaya production: ranked 15th

Economy

 Nominal GDP: ranked 41st
 Nominal GDP per capita: ranked 161st
 Nominal GDP growth rate: ranked 82nd
 GDP (PPP): ranked 30th
 GDP (PPP) per capita: ranked 167th
 GDP (PPP) per capita growth rate: ranked 11th
 Remittance receiving: ranked 8th
 Foreign reserve: ranked 44th
 Ease of doing business: ranked 168th
Exports: ranked 52nd
Imports: ranked 47th
Unemployment rate: ranked 159th

Society

 Human Development Index: ranked 133rd
 Global Peace Index: ranked 91st
 Global Hunger Index: ranked 76th
 Global Health Security Index: ranked 95th
 Global Education Index: ranked 120th
 Population below poverty line: ranked 80th

Communications

 Number of mobile phone users: ranked 8th
 Number of internet users: ranked 9th
Number of Facebook users: ranked 10th

Energy

 Total energy production: ranked 49th 
Natural gas consumption: ranked 30th 
Natural gas reserve: ranked 45th
Electricity production: ranked 40th
Electricity consumption: ranked 50th

Industry

 Salt production: ranked 24th
Textile industry: ranked 2nd
Pharmaceuticals: ranked 71st
IT: ranked 102nd

Security

 Number of police personnel: ranked 16th
 National Cyber Security Index: ranked 65th
Largest single force: ranked 1st

Cities

 Largest city by population, 2020: Dhaka, ranked 7th
Most expensive city for expatriates 2020: Dhaka, ranked 26th

References

Bangladesh